Strathcona was a federal electoral district in the Northwest Territories and Alberta, Canada, that was represented in the House of Commons of Canada from 1904 to 1925. It was centred on the town (later city) of Strathcona, later a part of Edmonton.

When it was created, the riding was part of the North-West Territories. It was huge. It stretched from the present western boundary of Alberta (at the time the western boundary of the provisional district of Alberta) east well into what is now the Province of Saskatchewan. It was wholly on the south side of the North Saskatchewan River, while Edmonton was on the north side. 

In 1905, when Saskatchewan and Alberta became provinces, the riding found itself split between them. In 1907, it was redrawn to fall entirely in Alberta, with the Saskatchewan part being transferred to the Battleford riding. Strathcona was abolished in 1925 when it was redistributed between Edmonton East, Edmonton West Vegreville and Wetaskiwin ridings.

The federal riding of Edmonton Strathcona/Edmonton-Strathcona was reborn in 1953. It covers a part of urban Edmonton that had once been in the pre-1924 Strathcona federal riding.

Members of Parliament 

This riding elected the following Members of Parliament:

Peter Talbot, Liberal (1904–1906)
Wilbert McIntyre, Liberal (1906–1909)
James McCrie Douglas, Liberal (after 1911 election became Unionist, later becoming a Conservative (1909–1921)
Daniel Webster Warner, Progressive (1921–1925)

Election results

*Gregory ran under auspices of the Lacombe-based Farmers Association of Alberta. He spoke in favour of nationalization of the railways, protection for the farmers and government loans to farmers. 

By-election: 
On Mr. Talbot's appointment to the Senate, 8 March 1906, he resigned his House of Commons seat.

By-election: On Mr. McIntyre's death, 21 July 1909

See also 

 List of Canadian federal electoral districts
 Past Canadian electoral districts
Strathcona Alberta provincial electoral district
Strathcona Northwest Territories territorial electoral district

References

External links 

Former federal electoral districts of Alberta
Former federal electoral districts of Saskatchewan
Former federal electoral districts of Northwest Territories